Lomokankro is a town and sub-prefecture in central Ivory Coast. It is a sub-prefecture of Tiébissou Department in Bélier Region, Lacs District.

Lomokankro was a commune until March 2012, when it became one of 1126 communes nationwide that were abolished.

In 2014, the population of the sub-prefecture of Lomokankro was 14,835. The town has an area of 420km^2. Lomokankro is 24km from Tiébissou and 17km from Didievi.

Villages
The 23 villages of the sub-prefecture of Lomokankro and their population in 2014 are:

References

Sub-prefectures of Bélier
Former communes of Ivory Coast